Sunny Side of the Street is the second studio album by Bryn Haworth, released in 1975.

Interviewed in 2009, Haworth commented on the album opening with the gospel song 'Good Job': ".. I thought it was a great track. I thought, I've never heard anything like this before. I'd been listening to Andraé Crouch and all the Blind Boys stuff because there was nothing to listen to when you became a Christian back then so you'd go back in time. Andre Crouch: Live At Carnegie Hall was the best album that I'd heard at that time and then you went back to The Blind Boys and all the black gospel stuff and I thought, this is what I relate to because it's like R&B. My roots are more R&B roots; old style. So it started to come out in things like 'Good Job'."

Track listing

Recording
The album was recorded at Island Studios, Hammersmith and Sound Techniques, Chelsea, London.

Musicians 

Bryn Haworth - guitars, vocals (all tracks)
Bruce Rowland - drums (1,2,4,5,7,9), talking drum (4), maracas (9), marimbas (4), bells (7), percussion (4)
Terry Stannard - drums (1)
Alan Spenner - bass (1,9)
Chris Stainton - piano (1,2,9) and organ (1,9,10)
Pat Donaldson - "big" bass (8)
Dave Mattacks - drums (3,8,10)
Pete Wingfield - "krazy keyboard" (8)
Mel Collins - horns (6)
Dave Pegg - bass (3,5,7) and bass lightly (4)
Dave Swarbrick - fiddle (3)
Alan Munde - banjo (3)
Jimmy Mullen - guitar (6)
Tony O'Malley - piano (6)
Frank Collins - chorus (6)
Madeline Bell - chorus (1)
Lee Vanderbilt - chorus (1)
Joanne Williams - chorus (1)
Dyan Birch - chorus (6)
Paddy McHugh - chorus (6)
Gianin Loringett - tap dance (8)
Richard "Diga" Digby Smith and Planet - hand claps (8)

Other personnel
Bryn Haworth and Richard Digby Smith - producers
Richard Digby Smith - engineer
Dick Cuthell - assistant engineer
Victor Gamm - basic engineering (3,8,10)
Pennie Smith - cover photo
Tony Wright - cover illustrations
Eckford/Stimpson - design

Packaging
The original cardboard inner sleeve for the vinyl record is printed, on both sides, with multicoloured stripes to match the shop-front awning illustration of the front cover.

References

1975 albums
Bryn Haworth albums
Island Records albums